Rosamund Adoo-Kissi-Debrah  is a British grassroots campaigner who raises awareness of asthma and the health problems that can be caused by air pollution. Her work followed the death of her 9-year-old daughter, Ella Roberta Adoo-Kissi-Debrah, whose death was eventually attributed to excessive air pollution from London's South Circular Road.

Campaigning
Kissi-Debrah's campaign for clean air followed the death in 2013 of her 9-year-old daughter, Ella Roberta Adoo-Kissi-Debrah. Ella Roberta had experienced severe asthma attacks over several years, and the 2014 inquest reported only on Ella Roberta's medical care. Kissi-Debrah learned about the adverse health effects of air pollution, and campaigned for air pollution to be included on her child's death certificate. Her campaign led to a second inquest in 2020, where evidence about air pollution was considered, with the Record of Inquest finding Died of asthma contributed to by excessive air pollution. The subsequent Report to Prevent Future Deathsidentified the South Circular Road, London as the source of pollution. The finding was covered in the mediaat the time.

Kissi-Debrah also co-founded the Ella Roberta Family Foundation to promote her goals more widely to the public and officials. This charity aims to improve the lives of children affected by asthma in South East London. It engages with politicians and policy makers as well as young people and communities to raise awareness of asthma, advocate for better medical treatment of asthma and also campaigns for clean air. Kissi-Debrah is the executive director.

She has worked with the Mayor of London on the Healthy London Partnership and has contributed to expansion of the Ultra Low Emission Zone in London, now planned for 2023, that aims to reduce air pollution from cars. Low traffic neighbourhoods have been introduced in London, partly to reduce air pollution. Kissi-Debrah has been drawn into the conflict between the potential for social and environmental benefits but also for damage from the diverted traffic flows. She has advocated for balance in reducing traffic and improving air quality. In a 2020 interview with the Guardian, she said: “For people who live in an LTN, yes, life is better, I don’t deny that, but their traffic is going somewhere. You cannot live in a neighbourhood where one part has an LTN and children are cycling and playing outside and the roads are safe, then pop along a couple of roads later and there’s gridlocked traffic. We cannot live in a society like that.”

Kissi-Debrah was a candidate in the 2018 Lewisham East by-election and the 2019 UK general election in the same constituency. She was also a candidate in the 2021 London Assembly election for the Green Party of England and Wales, finishing third in Greenwich and Lewisham.

She is a World Health Organization advocate for health and air quality.

Kissi-Debrah was one of the judges in the BLAC Awards in 2020.

Electoral history

Personal life
Kissi-Debrah lives on the South Circular Road in London. She is a secondary school teacher in Lewisham.

Honours and awards
In November 2020 she was included in the BBC Radio 4 Woman's Hour Power list 2020.

Kissi-Debrah was appointed Commander of the Order of the British Empire (CBE) in the 2023 New Year Honours for services to public health.

References

Living people
Year of birth missing (living people)
Air pollution in the United Kingdom
Black British activists
British women activists
Date of birth missing (living people)
English activists
Health activists
People from Lewisham
Schoolteachers from London
Green Party of England and Wales parliamentary candidates
Health and transport
Commanders of the Order of the British Empire